The 2011 Itaipava GT Brasil season is the fifth season of GT Brasil. It will begin on 10 April Interlagos and end on December 18 in the same circuit after ten weekends totalling twenty races will include a support at the São Paulo Indy 300..

Matheus Stumpf and Valdeno Brito clinched championship victory in the GT3 class, winning the championship by 39 points over their closest competitors. Stumpf and Brito won seven races during the season. Second place went to Xandy Negrão and Xandinho Negrão, and third place for Rafael Derani and Claudio Ricci.

Caio Lara and Cristiano Federico won the GT4 Class, won six races during the season including sweeping the weekend at Anhembi and at second meeting to be held in Curitiba, as well as a victory at Velopark and Campo Grande.

Rules changes and entries
The scoring system, which includes the fifteen finishers last year, will reward only the top ten of each race in 2011. Pirelli becomes the sole supplier of tires and for the first time in history, have pit stops for tire changes during the races of Rio de Janeiro in September and Campo Grande in October.

The category wins new cars in 2011, Corvette Z06-R GT3, Lamborghini Gallardo LP600 and Ferrari 458 Italia in GT3 and Aston Martin V8 Vantage GT4 in GT4. During the championship some cars entered in the category, Mercedes-Benz SLS AMG GT3 in GT3 and Maserati GranTurismo MC in GT4

Entry list

Race calendar and results
All races were held in Brazil.

Championship standings
Points were awarded as follows:

Drivers' championships

GT3

Notes
The top five after the race ensures a place on the podium.

GT4

Teams' championships

GT3

GT4

References

GT Brasil